Magic (What She Do) is a single by New Zealand band DD Smash. It was released in 1985 as the fourth single from The Optimist. The single charted at No. 6 in New Zealand. It was written by singer songwriter Dave Dobbyn.

 Bass – Gary Langsford
 Drums – Peter Warren (2)
 Engineer – Alan Thorne
 Producer – Charles Fisher
 Vocals, Guitar, Keyboards, Written-By – Dave Dobbyn

References

1984 singles
DD Smash songs
1984 songs
Mushroom Records singles
Songs written by Dave Dobbyn